Pearl Dawn is a skyscraper in Umhlanga, KwaZulu-Natal. The 31st story was completed in 2008. It is designed in a futurist style. It is the 5th tallest building in South Africa.

See also
Skyscraper design and construction
List of tallest buildings in Africa

References

Buildings and structures in Durban
Residential buildings completed in 2010
Residential skyscrapers in South Africa
21st-century architecture in South Africa